Katla (also Kaalak or Kwaalak) is a Katla language, closely related to a neighbouring language called Tima.  Katla is generally classified as Kordofanian, which is not a uniform branch, and is native to the Nuba Mountains (Birgit Hellwig 2013:238). While Jalad is seen a dialect there is a clear distinction between the two groups. Similarly one can distinguish Katla into east and west Katla dialects (Brigit Hellwig 2013: 238), it is believed to be spoken in 11 villages around Jebel Katla and their ethnicity is kàlàk (Brigit Hellwig 2013: 238).  

The variety Julud is mutually intelligible with Katla-Kulharong but not with Katla-Cakom.

Phonology 
The following information is of the Julut dialect:

Consonants

Vowels

Nouns

Plural 
Most of the time nouns in Katla do not have a plural, either numbers are put in front of the word or a quantifier is used. Often loanwords do not follow this rule and therefore change in their plural form (Meinhof 1917: 219 )

Genitive case 
In lot of cases Katla follows the Sudanese way of placing the genitive after the substantive: ‚u gbalana‘ " the dog’s owner ". Usually although this is tried to bee avoided and put in between both nouns: ‚gas i gu‘ „the dog’s head“ (Meinhof 1917:221)

Subjective case 
The subjective case is put infringement of the verb. In the case of multiple objects each one gets a case:

‘gu šekemole retet’ “The dog bit the gazelle” (Meinhof 1917:221)

Pronouns 
Ṇ- 	I 

Dj- 	You

Y- 	She/He/It

Ni-, N-, Ń- 	We

Dj- 	You (pl.)

Y- 	They

Numbers 
1 tẹták

2 sẹk

3 hātẹd

4 agálam

5 jẹgwūlẹn

6 djọltẹn

7 djolēk

8 taṅgẹl

9 djalbatẹn

10 rākwẹs

Dialects and locations
Dialects and village locations:
Julud dialect: Kabog, Kabog North, Kabosh, Kambai, Karkando, Karkarya, Kary, Kimndang, Kitanngo, Kolbi, Koto Kork, Octiang, Rumber, Sabba, and Tolot
Katla dialect: Bombori, Karoka, Kateik, Kiddu, Kirkpong, and Koldrong

References

Katloid languages